Catasema is a monotypic moth genus of the family Noctuidae. Its only species, Catasema vulpina, is found in Uzbekistan. Both the genus and species were first described by Otto Staudinger in 1888.

References

Cuculliinae
Monotypic moth genera